Halite is an open-source computer programming contest developed by the hedge fund/tech firm Two Sigma in partnership with a team at Cornell Tech. Programmers can see the game environment and learn everything they need to know about the game. Participants are asked to build bots in whichever language they choose to compete on a two-dimensional virtual battle field.

History
Benjamin Spector and Michael Truell created the first Halite competition in 2016, before partnering with Two Sigma later that year.

Halite I 
Halite I asked participants to conquer territory on a grid. It launched in November 2016 and ended in February 2017. Halite I attracted about 1,500 players.

Halite II
Halite II was similar to Halite I, but with a space-war theme. It ran from October 2017 until January 2018. The second installment of the competition attracted about 6,000 individual players from more than 100 countries. Among the participants were professors, physicists and NASA engineers, as well as high school and university students.

Halite III
Halite III launched in mid-October of 2018. It ran from October 2018 to January 2019, with an ocean themed playing field. Players were asked to collect and manage Halite, an energy resource. By the end of the competition, Halite III included more than 4000 players and 460 organizations.

Halite IV
Halite IV was hosted by Kaggle, and launched in mid-June of 2020.

See also 

 List of computer science awards
 Competitive programming

References

External links
 Halite AI Challenge

Programming contests
Computer science competitions
Artificial intelligence